Águeda Pérez López (born 5 January 1974) is a Mexican taekwondo practitioner, born in Mexico City.

She competed at the 2000 Summer Olympics in Sydney.

References

External links

1974 births
Living people
People from Mexico City
Mexican female taekwondo practitioners
Olympic taekwondo practitioners of Mexico
Taekwondo practitioners at the 2000 Summer Olympics
World Taekwondo Championships medalists
Pan American Games medalists in taekwondo
Pan American Games bronze medalists for Mexico
Medalists at the 1999 Pan American Games
Taekwondo practitioners at the 1999 Pan American Games
20th-century Mexican women
21st-century Mexican women